Maja e Kollatës is the mountain peak in the Bjeshkët e Namuna range in northern Albania. The second and third highest are Zla Kolata and Dobra Kolata on the border to Montenegro just northwest of the main peak.

References 

 

Mountains of Albania
Mountains of Montenegro
Two-thousanders of Albania
International mountains of Europe
Valbonë Valley National Park